Kotipizza Oyj is the largest pizza restaurant chain in the Nordic countries.  is Finnish and translates as "home". Kotipizza is part of Kotipizza Group, and it operates a chain of pizza franchises in Finland. In 2021, there were 290 Kotipizza restaurants in Finland. Its head office is in Helsinki, Finland.

History
Kotipizza was founded in 1987 by Rabbe Grönblom in Vaasa, Finland.

In 1992 there were 100 Kotipizza restaurants. In 1995, a shop-in-shop concept that reduced the start-up costs of a new location was taken into use together with the Neste Oil service station chain. By 1996 there were 200 Kotipizza restaurants.

In the 21st century Kotipizza's motto was "Pizza, Love & Understanding". In 2008, Grönblom's family company sold the majority of Kotipizza to a company founded by Kotipizza employees. Next year, Kotipizza started a cooperation with the Teboil service station chain.

By the end of 2010, the Kotipizza chain constituted some 281 restaurants in over 130 municipalities. The most northern Kotipizza restaurant in Finland was located in Karigasniemi in the municipality of Utsjoki.

In 2011, Grönblom returned as the chief shareholder of the company, but by August 2011, he had already sold three quarters of his shares in Kotipizza to Finnish private equity company Sentica Partners and remained a minority shareholder, with a one-fifth share, of the company.

In 2012 Tommi Tervanen became the CEO of Kotipizza and began renewing the chain. The restaurants’ interior design was updated, and the origin of ingredients was highlighted more than before. The overall revenue of the Kotipizza restaurant chain was 72 million euro. Over 95% of the Kotipizza restaurants in Finland were operated by francisees. In addition to Finland, Kotipizza restaurants were found in Saint Petersburg, Estonia and in China in Suzhou, near Shanghai.

In 2014, Grönblom handed over the ownership of the company completely.

In the financial year 2016, the total sales of Kotipizza restaurants amounted to EUR 90 million with net sales of EUR 67 million. 

In December 2017, the Kotipizza chain's monthly sales exceeded EUR 10 million for the first time. 

In April 2018, the same-store sales of comparable Kotipizza restaurants (240 restaurants) had increased for 37 months in a row. The number of restaurants stood at 260. In November 2018 European food manufacturer Orkla announced that it will acquire Kotipizza's owner, Kotipizza Group.

In 2020 Kotipizza’s overall revenue was 151 million euros, 13.6% more than in the previous year. The growth was generated by increased online sales and home delivery. Over 40 % of all transactions happened via the chain’s online store.

In February 2021, online sales amounted to 45 % of Kotipizza’s total sales.

In 2021 Heidi Stirkkinen became the CEO of Kotipizza.

Business
In 2021, Kotipizza operated only in Finland, and all 290 restaurants were run by franchisees. Some restaurants offer delivery and accept online or phone orders. The home delivery restaurants utilise the home delivery concept created in cooperation with the chain's franchisees. Built-in heat boxes in delivery vehicles keep pizzas at 60 degrees Celsius even for an hour.

Products
In 2016, 62 per cent of all ingredients used at Kotipizza restaurants came from Finland. For instance, the million kilograms of cheese used by the chain was acquired from 70 Valio dairy farms located in the area of Lapinlahti, Finland.

In 2014, the most popular pizza of the Kotipizza chain was Perfetta, for which four pizza toppings are picked freely. The second most popular pizza was Special Opera, a pizza with ham, salami and tuna. The third most popular pizza was Americana, which includes Aura cheese, ham and pineapple. Furthermore, Tropicana, Kotzone Chicken (i.e. a folded pizza base with salad and other toppings), Opera, Quattro Stagioni, Bolognese, Mexicana and Burger were among the top 10 products.

In 2018, the top 10 most sold products via Kotipizza's online store were Perfetta, Custom Monster, Special Opera, Americana, Kotzone Chicken, Tropicana, Custom Kotzone, Meat Master, Quattro Stagioni and Texas Monster. Monster is a product developed by Kotipizza which includes dough sticks on a pizza. In the Helsinki metropolitan area and in larger cities, Kotipizza sold significantly more vegetarian pizzas and toppings (such as Härkis bean protein and falafel) than anywhere else in Finland.

In 2019, the most popular toppings ordered via Kotipizza’s online store were pineapple, ham, pepperoni and blue cheese.

Pizza Berlusconi

Pizza Berlusconi is Kotipizza's product name for a pizza with smoked reindeer, tomato sauce, cheese, chanterelle mushrooms and red onion.

Kotipizza named the pizza after Italian Prime Minister Silvio Berlusconi in their summer 2008 ad campaign and menu. Berlusconi had caused a minor diplomatic incident in 2005, when he said that he had had to "endure" Finnish cuisine, and joked disparagingly about Finns eating "marinated reindeer". Although marinated reindeer is a common dish in Lapland, in the rest of Finland the meat is traditionally stewed or dried.

Recognition
Kotipizza has been chosen as the best franchising chain of the year in 1992, 2009 and 2017.
In 2017, the Kotipizza chain received the MSC ecolabel, confirming that all fish and seafood served by the chain come from sustainable sources and certified fisheries. Kotipizza was the first pizza chain in the world to be licensed to use the label. Products with the MSC ecolabel are guaranteed to have been responsibly caught by a certified sustainable fishery.
With Pizza Berlusconi, Kotipizza won the America's Plate International pizza contest in New York City in March 2008, beating the Italian-Americans, who came in second place, and the Australians in third.

See also

 List of pizza franchises

References

External links
 
  
 Official home delivery site 
 D'Agosta, Alex. Translation to English by Giles Watson. Reindeer Pizza Named after Berlusconi." Corriere della Sera. 13 June 2008.
 D'Agosta, Alex. "Pizza alla renna, Berlusconi 'testimonial'." Corriere della Sera. 11 June 2008. Last modified 12 June 2008. 

Companies based in Helsinki
Restaurant chains in Finland
Regional restaurant chains
Pizza franchises
Restaurants established in 1987
Finnish companies established in 1987